The World Tour 2023/2024 is an upcoming concert tour by American rock band Blink-182. The tour is scheduled to begin on May 4, 2023, at Xcel Energy Center in St. Paul, Minnesota. The tour was announced on October 11, 2022, alongside the news of Blink-182 reuniting with vocalist/guitarist Tom DeLonge for the first time since 2014.

Background
The tour will mark the band's thirtieth anniversary, and their first tour with original singer and guitarist Tom DeLonge since 2014. It also marks their first-ever shows in Latin America. The band has not played Mexico in any capacity since 2004. Previous efforts to tour worldwide were complicated by Barker's flight anxiety following his 2008 plane crash. Barker flew for the first time since that incident in 2021, enabling the band to set dates across the globe.  On March 1, 2023 Tom Delonge announced on his Instagram that the Latin American dates would be postponed until 2024 due to Barker getting surgery done due a finger injury sustained during rehearsals.

Tour dates

References

2023 concert tours
2024 concert tours
Upcoming concert tours
Blink-182 concert tours
Concert tours of South America
Concert tours of North America
Concert tours of Europe
Concert tours of Oceania
Concert tours of Mexico
Concert tours of the United States
Concert tours of Canada
Concert tours of the United Kingdom
Concert tours of Germany
Concert tours of Spain
Concert tours of Australia
Concert tours of New Zealand